"Spider-Verse" is a 2014–15 comic book storyline published by Marvel Comics. It features multiple alternative versions of Spider-Man that had appeared in various media, all under attack by Morlun and his family, the Inheritors. The event was touted as including every single living spider-powered individual created up to that point, while also introducing many new ones. There were several notable exceptions however, such as the Spider-Man from the television series The Spectacular Spider-Man unable to appear due to copyright restrictions.

The comic book series received generally positive reviews. Following the conclusion of the event in Amazing Spider-Man #14, several characters introduced in it such as Spider-Gwen, the Spider-Woman of Earth-65, were featured in titles of their own. Several of the Spider-Men from this event reunited for the second volume of Spider-Verse set during the Secret Wars and continued to operate together in the Web Warriors series. The 2017 event "Venomverse" was structured in a similar way to Spider-Verse, featuring alternative versions of Venom instead. In 2018, a direct sequel to Spider-Verse titled Spider-Geddon was released. A conclusion to the Spider-Verse storyline—titled End of the Spider-Verse—is scheduled to begin later in 2022, following the release of the Edge of Spider-Verse series in August 2022 which introduces even more new alternate versions of Spider-Man.

The idea of bringing together alternate versions of Spider-Man was also explored in various video games and the Ultimate Spider-Man animated series, with the 2018 animated film Spider-Man: Into the Spider-Verse and its sequels Across the Spider-Verse (2023) and Beyond the Spider-Verse (2024), serving as a loose adaptation of this story arc. The 2021 Marvel Cinematic Universe film Spider-Man: No Way Home also took inspiration from this idea, featuring all three live-action movie versions of Peter Parker.

Publication history
The premise of a crossover was conceived by Dan Slott, who wrote the core part of the story in The Amazing Spider-Man (vol. 3) #9–15, after working on the 2010 video game Spider-Man: Shattered Dimensions which featured Amazing, Ultimate, Noir and 2099 versions of Spider-Man. The last two episodes of Spider-Man: The Animated Series about multiple Spider-Men going across dimensions fighting villains, also served as inspiration. Slott's idea was originally postponed to make room for the 2012 Spider-Men storyline by Brian Michael Bendis, which featured the first meeting of the original Peter Parker, and Miles Morales of the Ultimate Universe. Beginning in August 2014, the event was preceded by two new issues of the cancelled The Superior Spider-Man, issues of Spider-Man 2099 and a five-issue run of one-shots, all under the Edge of Spider-Verse banner.

Titles involved

Plot

Prelude
On Earth-311, Peter Parquagh is on stage at the Globe Theater when Morlun appears. Peter attempts to defend himself, but Morlun proves too powerful and absorbs Peter's life essence. Before disappearing into another dimension, Morlun declares that all spiders will die. Shortly after his death, his universe was destroyed.

Edge of Spider-Verse

Edge of Spider-Verse: Superior Spider-Man
The Superior Spider-Man (Doctor Octopus' mind in Spider-Man's body) is pulled via a time warp into the year 2099. Superior Spider-Man attempts to return home, but instead transfers to alternate Earths, where he finds the bodies of alternate Spider-Men, all slain by similar double-puncture wounds. He decides to assemble an army of Spider-Men to fight the killer.

On Earth-2818, home of the cyborg Spider-Man, the Superior Spider-Man and his new team (Spider-Man Noir, the Six-Armed Spider-Man, Spider-Monkey, Ashley Barton and the Assassin Spider-Man) set an ambush for Karn, which backfires when Karn reveals he is unaffected by their weapons. The team is only able to escape when Karn's brother and sister Brix and Bora arrive, and fight among themselves. Meanwhile, Karn had escaped the little incursion between his brother and sister, and hops into another multiverse to kill an Alternate Ai Apeac by reminiscing his past life as an Inheritor, and sucking away his life force essence back at him.

Edge of Spider-Verse: Miniseries
Earth-90214 is the home of Spider-Man Noir. While battling Mysterio, Spider-Man is attacked by Karn, but saved by the timely arrival of the Superior Spider-Man, who takes them back to the year 2099.

On Earth-65, Gwen Stacy became Spider-Woman, while Peter Parker became the Lizard. Peter died while fighting Gwen, and Spider-Woman is blamed for his death by J. Jonah Jameson and her father, Captain George Stacy. She is a member of the Mary Janes, a rock band led by Mary Jane Watson. At a gig where her band is playing, an assassin makes an attempt on George Stacy's life. Gwen defeats the assassin, but Captain Stacy holds Spider-Woman at gunpoint. Gwen is forced to reveal who she is. Shocked, Captain Stacy tells her to leave while she can. The events are watched by a British Spider-Man called Spider-UK.

In a Japanese anime-like universe, Aaron Aikman uses his spider-based powers in an advanced suit of armor to become the Spider-Man. Years ago, Aaron's old lover Kaori Ikegami found her daughter brain dead after a car accident. Kaori became a recluse, but has now returned claiming that her daughter is awake and possessed by something. Kaori's daughter forces her to kidnap people, possessing those people in turn, and now the possessed are assembling into an army. Aaron suits up, and begins to head out the door. But Morlun appears, and tells him that "this is the end of your story." However, it is unknown if he killed this Spider-Totem or not, when he approached him at the door."

On Earth-51412, Patton Parnel is a disturbed young man who lives with his abusive Uncle Ted. Patton "experiments" on animals and spies on his next-door neighbor Sarah Jane. On a trip to Alcorp Industries, Patton is bitten by a red spider. Patton gradually exhibits spider-like behavior, trapping several people (including Uncle Ted) in webs as food sources. When Sarah Jane comes to Patton's house looking for Gene, Patton kisses her, bites her neck, then transforms into a monstrous spider-like creature. Morlun arrives and drains Patton's life force, allowing Sarah Jane to escape. The following morning, hundreds of baby black spiders emerge from the bite on Sarah Jane's neck.

And once more, in another Japanese anime-like universe, Peni Parker is a half-Asian school girl whose father piloted the robot SP//dr. SP//dr's pilot is chosen by an intelligent radioactive spider who becomes mentally-linked to the new pilot. After her father dies in battle, Peni take his place. Peni is recruited by Spider-Ham and Old Man Spider (an elderly Spider-Man from Earth-4 who wears the same costume as "Last Stand Spider-Man") to join the fight against Morlun and his family.

Edge of Spider-Verse: Spider-Man 2099
The Miguel from the Exiles begins having visions when the Destiny War Miguel O'Hara is killed. Miguel prepares to flee to Earth-616 where Morlun was once killed. As Morlun kills the Timestorm Spider-Man 2099, Earth-616's Miguel (now stuck in the 21st century) begins to feel the deaths as well. Just as the Exiles' Miguel is about to make the dimensional jump, Morlun arrives and kills him in front of the Earth-616 Miguel. Hesitant to step into Earth-616 as he is afraid of that Earth's Peter Parker, Morlun retreats. Miguel realizes he must find Peter Parker.

Edge of Spider-Verse: Amazing Spider-Man
At the Omniverse, Billy Braddock (a.k.a. Spider-UK) is one of the newest recruits of the Captain Britain Corps. Scanning other universes, he has seen the deaths of alternate Spider-Men by the Inheritors: Morlun slays Earth-1983 Spider-Man and his teammates the Iceman and Firestar; Bora and Brix arrive on Earth-999 and kill Spider-Cat; and on Earth-7831, Daemos kills Spider-Man and several of the animalistic residents of Counter-Earth. Daemos' brother Jennix detects Billy watching them; he immediately cuts the scanner feed. As Saturnyne and Lady Roma discuss their concerns about the Incursions that are destroying many dimensions, Spider-UK tries to explain about the killings of the Spiders across the multiverse. Saturnyne rebuffs him, but a sympathetic Roma gives him a talisman that allows him to travel through the web of life in order to save the remaining Spiders.

On Earth-982, Daemos attacks May Parker (Peter Parker's daughter and the heroine known as Spider-Girl). Her boyfriend Wes, Peter, and Mary Jane sacrifice themselves in order to save her and her baby brother Ben. Spider-UK and Last Stand Spider-Man arrive via portal and take her and Benjy away. May vows to kill Daemos.

Main plot
On Earth-001, Morlun is taunted by Daemos and Verna about which Spider-Man he killed. Verna goes on a hunt with her Hounds Sable, Fireheart, and Kravinoff (Earth-001's version of Silver Sable, Puma, and Kraven the Hunter). Daemos tells Morlun the family knows he has been avoiding a specific thread of the Great Web, which is revealed to be Earth-616.

On Earth-616, Spider-Man and Silk meet with Spider-Woman, Spider-Girl, Spider-Man 2099, Spider-UK, Spider-Girl of Earth-982, and Spider-Ham. Spider-UK explains they are the Spiders of other dimensions and that all the strands of the Great Web are converging on Earth-616 Peter. Spider-UK tells him Morlun's elder brother Daemos is coming to Earth-616 and all of them head into a portal to another dimension.

In Eastern Europe at the home of the New Warriors, Peter Parker's clone Kaine Parker (a.k.a. the Scarlet Spider) and other members of the New Warriors are beaten down by Daemos. Kaine stabs Daemos through the chest with his arm spikes. Daemos realizes that Kaine can hurt him, because he is the current receptacle of the Other. Old Man Spider-Man, the Spider-Man of Earth-70105, and the Spider-Woman of Earth-65 appear. Daemos snaps the Spider-Man of Earth-70105's spine and the others escape through a portal.

On Earth-13, a large group of Spider-Men are gathered. Cosmic Spider-Man tells Spider-Man this is a world where he never lost the Enigma Force and the Inheritors would be foolish to come here. However, he cannot leave his world or the Enigma Force would stay behind. Spider-UK says there is a war coming and Peter is the greatest of them all.

On Earth-001, at a dinner table laden with crippled Spider-Totems, Brix, Bora, Jennix, and Daemos wait impatiently for Morlun to arrive. Daemos dismisses Jennix's concern that the Spiders are banding together. The siblings' father Solus reveals he has known all along where the Bride, the Other, and the Scion are located, then asks his children what the Web of Life and Destiny means to them. Brix and Bora view the Web as an eternal game, a competition to see who can kill the most Totems. Jennix sees the Web as a puzzle to be solved, as the Web's Spider Deity, the Master Weaver, told him that he would never unravel its secrets. Daemos views the Web as a license for debauchery, as the Weaver informed him that he would perish before his father and he wants to enjoy what life he had left to the fullest. Morlun responds that as Solus' chosen heir, the Great Web is his legacy and obligation. Solus says the Web is all things and everywhere and that it is their kingdom, making them the Inheritors of All Creation. The Spider-Man from Earth-9105 calls the Inheritors thieves and warns that the other Spiders will stop them.

On Earth-1610, Miles Morales and Jessica Drew are attacked by Verna's Hounds, but are saved by the Superior Spider-Man, the Assassin Spider-Man, and Spider-Punk.

On Earth-13, Spider-Man asks why he is special and is told it is because he is the only one who faced an Inheritor and won. Spider-UK gets a reading on the second team and Old Man Spider-Man says they need to act quickly to recruit them. Peter insists Spider-Woman of Earth-65 stay behind. Old Man Spider-Man gives Spider-Man one of their devices to travel the Great Web and tells him to pick a team. Old Man Spider insists Silk remain behind, refusing to say why. Silk waits until they have gone through the portal and then follows.

The group arrive on Earth-928, and Peter is horrified to see the Superior Spider-Man in charge. Old Man Spider-Man tries to explain that Kaine and Silk are the receptacles of the Other and the Bride, but the Superior Spider-Man dismisses his talk of Totems as superstition. Daemos emerges from a portal and kills the Spider-Cyborg, but the Superior Spider-Man manages to kill Daemos. Spider-Man is surprised that Daemos's body does not disintegrate, as Morlun did when Spider-Man last killed him. Spider-Man 2099 explains they used 2099 technology to put Daemos' corpse in stasis. Old Man Spider-Man tries again to explain about the Totems, but is killed when a second Daemos (plus Brix and Bora) appears and snaps his neck. In the ensuing chaos, the Assassin Spider-Man is killed. Kaine and Ben Reilly deduce that the Inheritors are clones (explaining why their bodies disintegrate upon death) and Ben opens a portal to the Inheritors' home base. The Ultimate Spider-Woman (now going by the name the Black Widow) joins them, stating she is a clone as well. Spider-UK opens a portal to Earth-13 for the rest to escape. The dying Old Man Spider reveals himself to be Ezekiel Sims from Earth-4 and tells Peter to protect the Totems at all costs. Silk steals Spider-Man's portal device, intending to set right the deaths she caused and opens a portal while attracting the Inheritors' attention. The surviving Spiders regroup on Earth-13, where Spider-Man is met by an angry Superior Spider-Man, who announces they are at war with the Inheritors and from this point on, he is in charge.

Peter and Otto fight over who is better suited to lead the Spiders. Spider-Man realizes Otto thinks Peter is from before the mind-swap took place, not after. Taking advantage of this, Spider-Man challenges the Superior Spider-Man to prove his superiority and kill him. Unwilling to create a time paradox, the Superior Spider-Man backs down. Spider-Man tells the Superior Spider-Man that since the Inheritors cannot die, killing is not the solution.

On Earth-13989, Karn slays a werewolf version of Spider-Man called Spider-Wolf and asks Solus if he can finally return home. Solus commands the Master Weaver to send Karn to another more challenging world. Solus mocks Morlun's fear of the Spider-Man of Earth-616. Morlun says he is concerned about the prophecy and that "the Other," "the Bride," and "the Scion" have all manifested. Solus agrees they could end the Inheritors' reign, but rebukes him when Morlun says the Scion still lies outside their reach. Solus calls for Jennix to join them, claiming it is time to crush the Spiders' last hope.

On Earth-13, Spider-Man tells the Superior Spider-Man he respects his expertise and would be a fool not to seek his advice. Checking with their away teams, Peter gets no response from Kaine's group, and is brushed off by Spider-Man 2099. The Superior Spider-Man says he has located the Inheritors' homeworld, but they need a stronger army. Peter asks Spider-Girl, the Spider-Woman of Earth-65, Miles Morales, and the Animated Spider-Man to help gather recruits. Spider-Man apologizes to Gwen for his prior overprotectiveness. He confesses he failed to save the Gwen Stacy of his world and in turn, Gwen tells him of her failure to save the Peter of her world.

On Earth-13, Morlun and Jennix emerge from portals, killing Captain Spider and Spider-Monkey. Captain Universe Peter Parker destroys Jennix with the Enigma Force. Solus arrives and reveals the Enigma Force is pure life force energy on which the Inheritors feed and devours Cosmic Spider-Man.  Morlun takes Benjy Parker from Spider-Girl of Earth-982, declaring him to be the receptacle of the Scion.

On Earth-802, Jennix regenerates from a clone fetus. He declines to return to the battlefield. Outside, the Black Widow of Earth-1610, Kaine, and the Spider-Man of Earth-92 prepare to make an assault on his headquarters, the Baxter Building.

Back on Earth-13, the Spiders charge Solus, who easily kills the Prince of Arachne and Arachnosaur. Morlun takes Benjy to Earth-001. Spider-UK calls Spider-Man and tells him the Safe Zone is lost. Spider-Man, the Spider-Woman of Earth-65, Spider-Girl, the Mangaverse Spider-Man, and Spider-Man J arrive, followed by Takuya Yamashiro, the Spider-Man of Earth-51778, who is flying his giant robot Leopardon. Takuya charges Solus, but Solus destroys Leopardon. The Spiders open a random portal in order to escape. Spider-Man tells him he has a plan and swears to Spider-Girl that they will find Benjy.

Silk, on the run from Brix and Bora, arrives on Earth-3145, a radioactive wasteland. When Brix steps out of the portal, he is nearly killed by the radiation before Bora can pull him to safety. Realizing that the irradiated world is off-limits to the Inheritors, Silk covers herself in web for protection and sets off looking for a familiar location.

The Spider-Army arrives on Earth-8847. Spider-Man tries to talk to Spider-Girl of Earth-982, but she refuses to listen to him. Peter is contacted by Spider-Woman, who has infiltrated the Inheritors' house by impersonating her Earth-001 counterpart. As her communicator is damaged, Peter loses Jessica's signal. Peter ask Miles to help her, along with his new recruits. Peter calls Miguel and Lady Spider on Earth-928 as they dissect Daemos' corpse. Miguel tells him they have discovered the Inheritors' cloning facility, but before he can say more, Jennix cuts the transmission. Since the Spiders have been moving and speaking across the dimensional threads of the Great Web, Jennix has been monitoring them the whole time.

On Earth-001, the Master Weaver tells Spider-Woman that Solus has forced him to reveal knowledge that has helped the Inheritors gain dominion over reality. As an act of rebellion, the Weaver has created seemingly insignificant threads that can change the design, allowing Spider-Woman to reach him so that he can give her the prophecies. These scrolls contain all they need to know of the Other, the Bride, the Scion, and something else. Morlun arrives and gives Benjy to Brix and Bora. Jessica manages to use her damaged transporter to send the scrolls to Peter before Morlun discovers them.

On Earth-8847, Spider-Man receives the scrolls and is also contacted by Silk. She tells Peter to get to Earth-3145 before Jennix blocks her. Arriving on Earth-3145, the Spiders follow web arrows left by Cindy directing them Earth-3145's Sims Tower. They find Sim's bunker, which Spider-Man knows is designed to hide them from the Inheritors. Inside, they find Silk, along with Earth-3145's spider-totem: that world's Uncle Ben.

On Earth-3145, Uncle Ben explains that after being bitten by the spider, he became his world's Spider-Man. All went well until his nemesis the Emerald Elf (this world's version of the Green Goblin) discovered his secret identity and killed Aunt May and Peter. Brokenhearted, Ben gave up being Spider-Man. When Ezekiel Sims told him he was in danger from Morlun, Ben accepted his offer to stay in the bunker. Sometime afterwards, this world's Doctor Octopus held the world at ransom with nuclear weapons. With no Spider-Man to face him, the ransom was paid, but the bombs were accidentally detonated, killing everyone on this Earth.

Angered by the actions of his counterpart, the Superior Spider-Man attempts to translate the scrolls using his holographic assistant. When Spider-Man notes that it resembles Anna Maria Marconi, the Superior Spider-Man realizes that Spider-Man is from his future, meaning that Otto will eventually lose everything. Spider-Girl reveals that, due to her original powers having come from a cult that worships the Master Weaver, she can read the text. The first scroll contains a prophecy that the Inheritors will lose to the Spiders 1,000 years in the future, and the only way of averting this fate is by sacrificing the Other, the Bride, and the Scion, which will stop new totems from existing. Spider-Girl of Earth-982 demands they travel to Earth-001 and rescue Benjy, the Scion.

On Earth-802, Kaine, the Black Widow of Earth-1610, and Ben Reilly have destroyed Jennix's cloning facilities, at the cost of Ben's life. The Inheritors, sensing the presence of the Other and the Bride, go on the offensive. On Earth-3145, Spider-Girl states they can use the contents of the second scroll, which contains Karn's life story, to turn him to their side. Spider-Man contacts Kaine, who reveals he is on Loomworld and intends to kill the Inheritors. Spider-Man contacts his away teams, ordering them to rendezvous at Earth-001.

On Earth-001, Kaine transforms into a massive Man-Spider as the Inheritors arrive. Kaine impales Solus on multiple spines, killing him. An enraged Morlun rips off one of the Other's legs and stabs it through the head, apparently killing Kaine.

On Earth-3145, Peter tries to talk Uncle Ben into joining the fight, quoting his Uncle Ben's lesson that "with great power must also come great responsibility". Ben, however, is afraid to fail again. An angry Superior Spider-Man upbraids Ben, stating that he lost more times than he won, but that did not keep him from fighting. The Superior Spider-Man's rant inspires Ben to put on the costume and the Spider-Army sets off for the final battle.

The Spiders and a now-redeemed Karn head to Loomworld for the final battle with the Inheritors. Miguel O'Hara and Lady Spider arrive with a repaired Leopardon, now powered by radioactive isotopes. Spider-Ham disguises himself as Benjy, allowing Ben Parker to take Benjy back to his home reality. Meanwhile, the Superior Spider-Man's plan to put an end to the Inheritors' reign by killing the Master Weaver does stop the Inheritors, but also causes the fabric of reality to unwind. Spider-Girl threatens to destroy the crystal that contains Solus' soul, but changes her mind after realizing that "heroes don't kill". The Inheritors are exiled to Earth-3145, where they are forced to hide in the Sims bunker to avoid death by radiation, while feeding off the radioactive spiders.

Tie-in issues

Scarlet Spiders
Earth-802 is ruled by Jennix of the Inheritors. The Spider-Man of Earth-94, the Scarlet Spider (Kaine), and Jessica Drew, the Black Widow of Earth-1610 travel here in order to find the secret of his cloning process, but are intercepted by this Earth's Tony Stark. The Spiders overpower Stark and learn that Jennix's headquarters are in the Baxter Building. Spider-Man uses Stark's Iron Man armor to impersonate him and gain access to the Baxter Building. In the Baxter Building, Jennix reveals to the Spiders that he has attempted to clone numerous Spider-Men from across the Multiverse, in an attempt to create a stock of spider-totems to consume. However, his experiments have failed because he has not been able to clone the essence of the spider (which the Inheritors feast on) into the cloned body. The Spider-Man of Earth-94 sets out to destroy the device which receives the signal that allows the Inheritors to transmit their life force into new bodies. Unable to activate it remotely, Spider-Man is forced to explode the device manually, sacrificing himself in the process. Kaine is furious and steals Jessica's teleporter, then heads directly to Earth-001 to kill the Inheritors.

Spider-Man 2099
The Six-Armed Spider-Man, Spider-Man 2099 and steam punk Lady Spider of Earth-803 travel to 2099 in order to dissect the clone body of Daemos for clues on how to defeat his brethren. Followed to the future by a new Daemos, the Six Armed Spider-Man creates a distraction, but is killed before Miguel traps the Inheritor in a stasis field. The trap is short-lived, as Daemos kills himself so another clone can be activated. Miguel enlists the help of the Earth-928 Punisher to hold off Daemos until Spider-Man 2099 and Lady Spider can transport back to the safe zone of Earth-13, only to find that it has been destroyed by Solus. They find Leopardon and transport the mecha to Earth-803. They borrow the lab of Lord Harry Osborn, who mentioned to his father that he knows Lady Spider, not realizing that his father is the Green Goblin. The Six Men of Sinestry attack, but are dispatched by Spider-Man 2099 and the fist rockets of Leopardon. They find uranium in Doctor Octopus' backpack and use it to get Leopardon fully operational for the final Inheritor showdown.

Spider-Verse
This miniseries explores various incarnations within the Spider-Verse. The first is Earth-2301, or the Marvel Mangaverse. Peter Parker returns to the Spider-Clan fortress and faces off with his cousin Venom, but Spider-UK rescues him.

On Earth-803 in a steam punk version of 1895, May Reilly's father kept animals in his study. One of these animals was a spider. One day, May Reilly tried to pet the spider, but it bit her. According to May, the spider taught her an important lesson: not to let anyone cage you. After her father died, May used spare parts of his garage to create a suit with four mechanical arms and mechanical web-shooters. During a ball May was attending, Electro took the mayor hostage. May used this as the opportunity to debut as Lady Spider. She confronted Electro and webbed him up. However, soon the rest of the Six Men of Sinestry (which also consisted of the Green Goblin, Doctor Octopus, Kraven the Hunter, Mysterio, and the Vulture) arrived. After taking some plans the mayor had hidden in his tuxedo, the Six Men of Sinestry were forced to retreat due to the opposition Lady Spider posed to them. Believing she would miss the ball, May left the scene to return there.

In Earth-51914, the designated universe for Hostess-branded comics, Spider-Man throws Mostess sponge cakes at Morlun before being quickly dispatched.

Earth-11 is the world of Penelope Parker, who is bitten by a radioactive spider. Her best friend is MJ, Flash is still the class bully, and their teacher is Miss Kraven. She puts on a hoodie and a paper bag over her head and rescues Flash before falling off a ledge.

Earth-77013 is the home of the comic strip Spider-Man. Morlun is unable to proceed since each "strip" is a repetition of the previous strip with only a partial progression in the story line. A frustrated Morlun leaves without killing that Spider-Man. The Master Weaver tells him that universe collapsed on itself, but he secretly hides that universe from the Inheritors.

In an unidentified Spider-Man video game, titled on a false Earth-30847's barren wasteland (the setting of the Marvel vs. Capcom franchise), Spider-Man is confronted by Morlun and announces his intent to kill him. Spider-Man goes on the offensive, using his most powerful attacks, but Morlun is uninjured and defeats him with a single punch, leaving the young video gamer boy playing the video game not surprised and outraged.

Kwaku Anansi of Earth-7082 is a spider totem that is recruited by Spider-UK, but before he can join, he needs to trick a demigod named Mister Mighty after stealing his sheep, then escape from Shango, the storm god.

On Earth-138, Hobart "Hobie" Brown was a homeless teenager transformed by a spider that was irradiated as part of President Norman "Ozzy" Osborn's toxic waste dumping. He becomes the punk-rock inspired Spider-Man, leading the downtrodden people of New York and the Spider-Army against Osborn's V.E.N.O.M. troops. Operating as Spider-Punk, Hobie kills President Osborn during a riot by bashing him with his guitar. After President Osborn is dead, Spider-Punk unmasks himself to the crowd as their savior.

Earth-TRN521 is a Spanish language comic set in Mexico City. Junior is the son of a luchador who died after unnecessary roughness organized by the mob. He becomes a vigilante named Arácnido. It is never explained how he got his powers, but he is recruited by Spider-UK.

During the final battle with the Inheritors, two Spider-Men stop to replace web cartridges and talk about some of the Spider-Men they met:

 "[T]he guy from Seabiscuit" (a reference to Tobey Maguire, star of the 2002–2007 Spider-Man films). 
 "[T]he guy who was in The Social Network" (a reference to Andrew Garfield, star of the 2012–2014 Spider-Man reboot)
 A "guy singing show tunes" (a reference to Spider-Man: Turn Off the Dark).
 A "Spider-man that kept trying to teach people how to read" (a reference to Spider-Man's appearances on the 1970s educational children's show The Electric Company).

Spider-Verse Team-Up
On Earth-94, Ben Reilly was not killed by the Green Goblin. He is fighting alternate versions of the Vulture sent by Verna when Old Man Spider and Spider-Ham arrive. During the fight, they are paralyzed by poisoned knives thrown by the Vultures. Ben manages to break free, due to having fought a similar type of control when he was bonded with the Carnage symbiote. He webs one of the Vultures, causing him to throw acid at one of his partners. The distraction is enough for Old Man Spider and Spider-Ham to break free and web the rest of the Vultures. They escape to Earth-13.

On an unknown Earth, Peter Parker had an allergic reaction to the bite of the radioactive spider, and lapsed into a coma. Uncle Ben and Aunt May are with Peter at the hospital while their house is burgled (meaning this Uncle Ben is not killed as the mainstream one was). Spider-Man Noir and the Six-Armed Spider-Man, having arrived to recruit Peter, realize the Inheritors will still come for him, despite his coma. Six-Armed Spider-Man creates a cure similar to the one which had given him his extra arms in order to save the comatose Peter. Before the antidote can be completed, Peter turns into a mindless Man-Spider and attacks Uncle Ben and Aunt May, but is restrained by Spider-Man Noir. The Six-Armed Spider-Man is able to cure Peter with the serum. Now powerless, they leave him since he will no longer be threatened by the Inheritors.

On Earth-67, Peter Parker hears of two Spider-Men spotted in New York City: the Animated Spider-Man and Miles Morales. Peter attacks them, but stops when Miles convinces him they are from alternate dimensions. Spider-Man-67 agrees to join them, but only after they help find the recently escaped Noah Boddy. Noah and the Spider-Catchers (consisting of Electro, Green Goblin, Scorpion, and Vulture) attack and incapacitate the three Spider-Men. When Noah and the Spider-Catchers argue over who should get the privilege to kill the heroes, the three Spider-Men manage to trick the Spider-Catchers into attacking each other, and Miles is able to render Noah Boddy unconscious with his venom blast. After dropping off the villains with the police, Spider-Man-67 leaves for Earth-13 with the other Spider-Men.

On Earth-21205, Verna and her Hounds Rhino and Scorpion arrive to hunt Hobgoblin (the identity of this world's Peter Parker) and attempt to drain his life force. Spider-Gwen is able help him. They are both shocked at first, since Spider-Gwen allowed her Peter to die and this Hobgoblin Parker is a vigilante after allowing Gwen to die. Soon the two are surrounded and Hobgoblin sacrifices himself to save Gwen and allow her to escape.

Karn comes to Earth-3123 to kill the spider-totem of this reality, where Aunt May was bitten by a radioactive spider and became Spider-Ma'am. May surrenders herself to keep her husband and nephew from harm. Karn is stopped by Spider-Girl, Spider-UK, Spider-Punk, Spider-Man: India, and Spider-Woman of Earth-807128. The Spiders, after revealing intimate details about his history, convince Karn to join them. The Spiders allow him to drain a non-lethal amount of life-force from each of them to satiate his hunger and Karn agrees to join them against the Inheritors.

Back in an underground bunker of Earth-3145, Mayday Parker is fed up with waiting and wants to head for Earth-001 immediately. That world's Uncle Ben tells her that attacking rashly will only lead to her death and Benji's death. She angrily punches a wall, which allows in millions of radioactive spiders. Ben helps Mayday stop the spiders and patch the hole in the wall. She promises to wait for her revenge on Daemos.

Spider-Woman
Spider-Woman followed Silk with Spider-Man Noir to an unknown reality where they were being tracked by Brix and Bora. Spider-Man Noir was wounded and the trio escaped to Earth-90214 to allow him to recover from his injuries. After this, she was sent by Spider-Man to Earth-001 to gather more information on the Inheritors, while Spider-Girl and Spider-Gwen and supposed to watch Silk, who sneaks away from them. Spider-Woman begins her infiltration on the Inheritors' headquarters where she manages to pose as the Jessica Drew of that universe, who is also Morlun's lover. Silk is cornered in a random universe by Brix and Bora, but sneaks behind them into Earth-001. Jessica 616 switches her good teleporter for Silk's broken teleporter and then asks this universe's Pirate Namor to help kidnap this universe's Jessica Drew. Silk then escapes to nuclear apocalypsis Earth-3145. Brix and Bora cannot survive in this universe and Silk then enters the SIM bunker, only to find that universe's Spider totem—Uncle Ben Parker. Jessica Drew also is invited on a date with Morlun, to her disgust. During the date she uses her pheromones to confuse Morlun and sneaks into the Master Weaver's lair. The weaver gives her an ancient prophesy that is the key to defeating the Inheritors. She uses her broken teleporter to send the scrolls to Spider-Man. Later Spider-Gwen, Spider-Girl and Silk come to rescue Jessica Drew and help the Jessica Drew from Earth-001 become the new benevolent dictator, since all the factions are fighting and only she can unite them. Back on Earth-616, Jessica asks Carol Danvers to join her in speaking with Captain America, since she is quitting the Avengers.

Aftermath
After recuperating, the Spiders open a portal to Earth-982 to send Spider-Girl of Earth-982 home. Returning to the ruins of her home, Spider-Girl meets Uncle Ben Parker from Earth-3145, who reveals that Mary Jane and Wes survived Daemos' attack. Uncle Ben chooses to remain on Earth-982 and live out the remainder of his life as Mayday's and Benjy's grandfather. Mayday is given her father's old costume and renames herself Spider-Woman. On Loomworld, the remainder of the Spider-Army say their goodbyes. When only Spider-UK, the Spider-Woman of Earth-65, Spider-Man 2099, and the Spiders from Earth-616 remain, Peter prepares to say goodbye to Spider-Man 2099 when their Spider-Sense collectively overwhelm them with agony. Karn realizes someone is tampering with the Web of Life and Destiny. They find the Superior Spider-Man hacking at the Web with Morlun's dagger. When Karn shouts that he could destroy the Multiverse, the Superior Spider-Man sneers that he is aware of his destiny and tries to reject his fate, revealing that he figured out that Peter Parker from his universe is from the future. On Earth-616, Julia Carpenter awakens from her coma and shouts that the Great Web is being destroyed and that she can see nothing of the future. As the Superior Spider-Man continues to cut the threads, Karn states that at any moment he could erase them from existence and Spider-UK states they are losing portals home. Peter tells the Spider-Woman of Earth-65 and Spider-Man 2099 to head to their home dimensions before it is too late, while he leads the Earth-616 Spiders against the Superior Spider-Man. The Spider-Woman of Earth-65 complains that she never found out how the story ended. Spider-Man 2099 reveals to her that in the end, Peter takes his body back from Doctor Octopus. The Superior Spider-Man battles with Spider-Woman and Spider-Girl, stating that by destroying the Web, he is giving them free will. Anya sees totemic script on the dagger. The Superior Spider-Man attempts to stab her before being punched away by Spider-Man. The Superior Spider-Man sneers that Spider-Man is a coward for ganging up on him, but Spider-Man points out that he did the same thing as the founder of the Sinister Six. Taking advantage of the distraction, Spider-Girl immobilizes the Superior Spider-Man's arm and reads that there will always be a Master Weaver at the center of the Great Web. Silk recalls that the Inheritors referred to her as the "Spinner at the center of the Web" and wonders if her destiny is to take the Master Weaver's place. While the Superior Spider-Man again tries to stab Spider-Girl, he snaps that his world needs him and that he is the greatest Spider-Man ever. Spider-Man and Spider-Woman knock him back, and Spider-Girl secures the dagger reading that anyone can take the place of the current Master Weaver, but only death can free the Master Weaver from their sacred obligation. Silk, having spent most of her life trapped in one room, balks at the idea of spending the rest of eternity trapped again and Karn commiserates with her. The Superior Spider-Man accuses Spider-Man and Spider-Woman of hypocritically claiming to fight for freedom, while trying to lock him on a fixed path that ends in his death. Peter snaps that it was the Superior Spider-Man himself that set the path in motion. Silk resolves to take the Master Weaver's place, unmasking him and expressing confusion at not recognizing his identity. Karn states that he finally knows who the Master Weaver is and unmasks himself, revealing that he and the Master Weaver are one and the same. The Superior Spider-Man punches Spider-Woman away, challenging Spider-Man to a one-on-one duel to see who the better hero is. Spider-Man retorts that a real hero would not have tried to murder Spider-Girl or destroy the Multiverse in order to save himself, revealing that the Superior Spider-Man will understand what it means to be a true hero when he willingly sacrifices himself and gives up their body of his own free will. Analyzing the Master Weaver's armor, Karn notices a slot that fits the prongs of the spear he made as a child, which acts as a key to open the mechanism. When Silk asks how he could possibly be in two places at once, Karn states that the flow of time differs in Earth-001, using the co-existence of Spider-Man and the Superior Spider-Man as an example. When Spider-Girl states that only a Spider Totem should be able to repair the web, Karn states that he has consumed enough Totems for their essence to enable him to take the Master Weaver's place, donning the Master Weaver's mask and stating that this shall be his penance and, hopefully, his salvation. Spider-Man defeats the Superior Spider-Man who feigns surrender, but puts Anna on a 100-day standby. Spider-Girl asks Karn if he can repair the damage done by the Inheritors and the Superior Spider-Man. Karn states that in time he can fix the web, but that in the meantime, all the Spiders' connections to it will be diminished where it will weaken their Spider-Senses. As Karn prepares to return him to the past, the Superior Spider-Man swears revenge on him. Spider-Man pushes Otto through the portal into the aftermath of the chronoton implosion that time-displaced him in the first place, his memory of the recent events erased. Karn remarks that weaving and repairing the Great Web is new to him, but that the existence of Earth-616 has been stabilized. Karn reveals that Spider-UK's dimension Earth-833 was destroyed. Spider-UK reveals that Incursions between dimensions have been erasing entire realities, lamenting that he was not able to help his fellow corpsmen face the danger. The Earth-616 Spiders console him, reminding him that, without his efforts, they would not have stood a chance against the Inheritors. When Silk asks if the Inheritors will be able to survive on Earth-3145 without draining the essence of Spider-Totems, Karn remarks that his family can subsist off the life force of any animal and that Earth-3145 is teeming with mutant spiders. Spider-Man laments the loss of Kaine. Spider-UK volunteers to travel the Multiverse and protect the worlds that lost their Spider-Totems. Spider-Girl volunteers to join him, much to Spider-Woman's surprise. Karn dubs them the Warriors of the Great Web and charges them with helping him repair the severed threads. When Spider-Girl wonders if they can do it alone, Spider-UK remarks they made a number of Amazing Friends as images of Mayday Parker of Earth-982 (who is now dubbed as Spider-Woman), Spider-Ham, Spider-Man Noir, Pavitr Prabhakar, and the Spider-Woman of Earth-65 appear in the Web of Life. Karn opens a portal to Earth-616 and the Spiders bid farewell, with Spider-Woman fussing over Spider-Girl and Spider-Man teasing Spider-UK one last time. After they depart, Karn offers the Warriors of the Great Web a tour of the Inheritor's palace. Unbeknown to them, a hand erupts from the Other's corpse, revealing Kaine is still alive. On Earth-616, Silk realizes they have been gone for days and hopes the Fact Channel has not fired her. Spider-Woman remarks that as his own boss, Peter does not need to worry about such things. Spider-Man corrects her, stating that for a long time, he did not feel ready to run his own company but that, after leading the Spider-Army, he feels ready for anything. As he swings across Times Square, Spider-Man wonders if he can ever go back to the small stuff after everything he has seen. As a woman being mugged calls out for help, Spider-Man chides himself and returns her purse after subduing the robber.

Reception
The main storyline received generally positive reviews, with critics praising the action, art, pacing, and story. However, the ending received some criticism for it being anticlimactic.

According to Comic Book Roundup, Amazing Spider-Man (vol. 3) #9 received a score of 8.3/10 based on 32 reviews, issue #10 received a score of 7.6/10 based on 16 reviews, issue #11 received a score of 8.2/10 based on 16 reviews, issue #12 received a score of 7.9/10 based on 20 reviews, issue #13 received a score of 7.6/10 based on 15 reviews, issue #14 received a score of 7.4/10 based on 21 reviews, and issue #15 received a score of 7/10 based on 18 reviews.

In 2015, Bleeding Cool highlighted a "common complaint" of the 648-page hardcover collection: "while the book gives a reading order to read the crossover, that order is not reflected in the book. Instead the individual titles are grouped together, rather than the Infinity Hardcover solution of presenting them in reading order. And because there are no page numbers following the actual reading order can be very hard. Advice given on reviews is to buy some post it notes and insert them throughout the volume for the beginning of individual issues and then refer to the reading order at the beginning".

Sequels

Secret Wars (2015) 
As part of the 2015 Secret Wars storyline, a Spider-Verse miniseries was featured on the domain of the Battleworld called Arachnia, starring Spider-Gwen, Spider-Ham, Spider-Man Noir, Spider-Man: India, Spider-UK and Anya Corazon. After the conclusion of Secret Wars, the team renamed itself and was featured in a new series called Web Warriors (a name that was coined by Peter Parker from the Ultimate Spider-Man TV series during the original Spider-Verse).

Spider-Geddon (2018) 

Spider-Geddon is a 2018 comic book limited series and crossover storyline published by Marvel Comics featuring multiple alternative versions of Spider-Man that had appeared in various media, and his supporting cast. In this sequel to Spider-Verse, the Inheritors have found a way out of the decimated world they were imprisoned on and are now determined to take their revenge on the Spider-Army and feed on them once again. Spider-Geddon was also marketed as "Revenge of the Spider-Verse".

End of the Spider-Verse (2022) 
In May 2022, Marvel announced that Dan Slott would return to helm "what Slott and Marvel are billing as the final Spider-Verse story: End of the Spider-Verse". This is scheduled start in August 2022 with a five-issue anthology miniseries which will then be followed by the core storyline beginning in October 2022 with the launch of the monthly Spider-Man ongoing by Slott and Mark Bagley. The anthology will focus on new multiversal variants of Spider-Man such as Night-Spider (a variant of Felicia Hardy), Hunter-Spider (a variant of Sergei Kravenoff), and Spider-Laird.

Collected editions

Softcover

Hardcover

In other media

Television
 The two-part series finale of Spider-Man: The Animated Series, "Spider-Wars" (1994), which sees the "prime" Peter Parker / Spider-Man joining forces with a version of himself who never lost Uncle Ben and lived a perfect life, a version of himself who took Doctor Octopus' arms, a six-armed Spider-Man, an actor playing Spider-Man, and Ben Reilly / Scarlet Spider to save the multiverse from Spider-Carnage, served as inspiration for the "Spider-Verse" comic storyline.
 Ultimate Spider-Man (2012) deals with the concept of the "Spider-Verse" throughout the third and fourth seasons:
 In the four-part episode "The Spider-Verse" (2015), the Green Goblin uses the Siege Perilous and an unwilling Electro to travel to six alternate universes and gather DNA from their unique Spider-Men, forcing his version of Peter Parker / Spider-Man to pursue him across the multiverse. Along the way, both the Goblin and Spider-Man encounter Spider-Man 2099, Petra Parker / Spider-Girl of a gender-inverted universe, Spider-Man Noir, Spider-Ham, the medieval-themed Spyder-Knight, and Miles Morales. Upon returning to their world, Spider-Man learns the Goblin used the six Spider-Men's DNA to enhance himself and become the "Spider-Goblin". In response, Spider-Man uses the Siege Perilous and Electro to draw in the six Spider-Men he encountered and form the "Web Warriors" to defeat the Goblin and cure him. In doing so, they free Electro, who goes on a rampage before the Web Warriors defeat him and return to their respective home universes. 
 In the episode, "Miles From Home", Morales joins forces with the "prime" Spider-Man to stop the former's version of the Green Goblin and Baron Mordo from stealing the Siege Perilous, which gets shattered and strewn across the multiverse in the process. After finding one of the fragments, a villainous version of Peter Parker called Wolf Spider seeks to collect the rest so he can rule the multiverse.
 In the four-part episode, "Return to the Spider-Verse" (2016), Madame Web, Iron Fist, and Doctor Strange combine their powers to send Parker and Morales through the multiverse once more to retrieve the fragments before Wolf Spider does. Along the way, they encounter old ally Spider-Man Noir, as well as new Spider-Men like the Victorian era-themed Blood Spider, the cartoon pirate Web Beard, the cowboy Web Slinger, and Spider-Gwen, who became the protector of Morales' universe after he was trapped in Parker's. While in Morales and Gwen's universe, the Web Warriors learn Wolf Spider captured all of the multiverse's Spider heroes so he can use the Siege Perilous to absorb their life forces and empower himself further. Realizing Wolf Spider was poisoning himself in the process, the "prime" Spider-Man allows his life force to be absorbed as well, overloading Wolf Spider and shattering him across the multiverse like the Siege Perilous. With their common enemy defeated, the captured Spiders regain their life forces and return to their respective home universes.

Film
 Spider-Man: Into the Spider-Verse (2018) is an adaptation of the "Spider-Verse" and "Spider-Men" storylines, which focuses on alternate universe versions of Spider-Man coming together to save their various realities from being destroyed by the Kingpin's Super-Collider. The central Spider character is Miles Morales, who is joined by an older, disheveled version Spider-Man named Peter B. Parker, Gwen Stacy / Spider-Woman, Spider-Man Noir, Peni Parker / SP//dr, and Spider-Ham.
 Into the Spider-Verse will be followed by two sequels, Spider-Man: Across the Spider-Verse and Spider-Man: Beyond the Spider-Verse, set to be released in 2023 and 2024, respectively. In the former, Morales goes on an adventure across the multiverse with Stacy and a new team of Spider-People, including Miguel O'Hara / Spider-Man 2099, in order to stop Jonathan Ohn / The Spot.
 The Marvel Cinematic Universe (MCU) film Spider-Man: No Way Home, features Tobey Maguire and Andrew Garfield reprising their roles as Peter Parker / Spider-Man, dubbed "Peter-Two" and "Peter-Three", from Sam Raimi's Spider-Man trilogy and Marc Webb's The Amazing Spider-Man films, respectively. They meet the MCU's version of Peter Parker (portrayed by Tom Holland) before joining forces to fight and cure the Green Goblin, Doctor Octopus, Sandman, the Lizard, and Electro.

Video games
 Spider-Man: Shattered Dimensions, written by Dan Slott before he wrote "Spider-Verse", features the Earth-616, Marvel Noir, 2099, and Ultimate versions of Spider-Man joining forces to acquire fragments of the Tablet of Order and Chaos after the 616 Spider-Man accidentally shattered it while fighting Mysterio, who also seeks the fragments after one of them grants him mystical powers. Over the course of the game, the four Spider-Men face various enemies enhanced by the tablet fragments' power, culminating in them confronting Mysterio as he uses the restored tablet's power to become a virtual god.
 Spider-Man: Edge of Time features a time travel plot involving the Earth-616 Spider-Man and Spider-Man 2099 working together simultaneously in the present and future to stop Alchemax scientist Walker Sloan from changing history and an evil future version of Peter Parker who became the CEO of Alchemax and intends to use Sloan's time portal to retroactively alter his past and undo his mistakes, regardless of the possibility of destroying the time-space continuum.
 A mobile game promoting the release of "Spider-Verse" called Spider-Man Unlimited was released on September 11, 2014, with a loose interpretation of the story. After the Earth-616 Spider-Man defeats a figure known as the "Gold Goblin", Nick Fury tells him that the Green Goblin assembled a multiversal Sinister Six via a portal and plans to take over their dimension. However, S.H.I.E.L.D. found a way to use the portal to bring in alternative versions of Spider-Man to aid him in the battle. For a number of events, both Morlun and Karn of the Inheritors have made appearances as bosses. In February 2015, the "Spider-Verse" storyline introduced new characters from the Spider-Army as well as the first appearances of Daemos and Jennix as bosses. In the closing moments of the event, Solus would make an appearance as a boss well. The game was recalled on March 31, 2019.
 The plot of "Spider-Verse" was adapted for the 27th Spec-Ops Mission of Marvel: Avengers Alliance. Originally announced as "Spider-Verse Part 1", the 27th Spec-Ops was released as "Along Came the Spiders". Karn became the first Inheritor featured in the game as a group boss. The 29th Spec-Ops, titled "Aranea Ex Machina", continued the game's adaptation of the "Spider-Verse" storyline, featuring Silk as the award hero and Morlun as the second Inheritor to be featured as a boss.
 Silk, Spider-Gwen, and Miles Morales were made playable characters in Marvel: Future Fight as part of the Spider-Verse promotion pack.
 Peter Parker, Miles Morales, and Spider-Gwen appear as playable characters in Marvel Ultimate Alliance 3: The Black Order. Additionally, this game adds Natasha Romanoff / Black Widow and Eddie Brock / Venom as additional members for a Web Warriors team bonus.

In popular culture
The term "Spider-Verse" has found its way into popular media as a term to describe a group of Spider-Men or different variations of Spider-Man.  Such is also a case for different Spider-Man related merchandise.

References

External links
Spider-Verse at Marvel Wiki
Spider-Man: Spider-Verse Reading Order Checklist at How to Love Comics

2014 comics debuts
2014 in comics
Comics about parallel universes
Spider-Verse (franchise)